William Caldwell may refer to:

Military
William Caldwell (ranger) (c. 1750–1822), Irish-Canadian soldier in the American Revolution and War of 1812
William B. Caldwell III (1925–2013), U.S. Army general
William B. Caldwell IV (born 1954), U.S. Army general, son of William B. Caldwell III

Law
William W. Caldwell (1925–2019), U.S. federal judge
William B. Caldwell (judge) (1808–1876), American judge

Politics
Billy Caldwell (1782–1841), Potawatomi leader
William Caldwell (Halifax mayor), former mayor of Halifax, Nova Scotia
William Caldwell (Wisconsin politician), member of the 1st Wisconsin legislature of 1848
William Bletterman Caldwell (1798–1892), governor of the Red River Settlement
William Clyde Caldwell (1843–1905), Ontario businessman and politician
William Murray Caldwell (1832–1870), New Brunswick businessman and political figure
William Parker Caldwell (1832–1903), member of the United States House of Representatives

Sports
Bill Caldwell (racing driver), New Zealand racing driver in 1966 Tasman Series
William Caldwell (cricketer) (1878–1964), English cricketer
Will Caldwell (born 1982), Australian rugby union player

Others
Acer campestre 'William Caldwell', field maple cultivar named for eponymous nurseryman
William Caldwell (Royal Navy officer), (died 1718), British admiral
William Caldwell (hymnist) (1801–1857), who compiled a hymn and tune book Union Harmony
William A. Caldwell (1906–1986), American journalist and columnist
William Hay Caldwell (1859–1941), Scottish embryologist